Pressure is a Reggae album by Maiko Zulu. The album was produced in 2003 with the hit song pressure.

References

2008 albums
Maiko Zulu albums